Margaret of Bavaria (1363 – 23 January 1424, Dijon) was Duchess of Burgundy by marriage to John the Fearless. She was the regent of the Burgundian Low Countries during the absence of her spouse in 1404–1419 and the regent in French Burgundy during the absence of her son in 1419–1423. She became most known for her successful defense of the Duchy of Burgundy against Count John IV of Armagnac in 1419.

Life
Margaret was the fifth child of Albert I, Duke of Bavaria, Count of Hainault, Holland, and Zeeland and Lord of Frisia, and Margaret of Brieg.

Marriage
On 12 April 1385, at the Burgundian double wedding in Cambrai, she married John, Count of Nevers, the son and heir of Philip the Bold, Duke of Burgundy, and Margaret of Dampierre, Countess of Flanders, Artois and Burgundy; at the same time her brother, William II, Duke of Bavaria, married Margaret of Burgundy.

Duchess regent
With the death of Philip the Bold in 1404, and Margaret of Dampierre in 1405, John inherited these territories, and Margaret became duchess. They had only one son, Philip the Good (1396–1467), who inherited these territories, and seven daughters.

In 1409, Margaret was named deputy regent of the Duchy of Burgundy, to rule whenever her spouse was absent from the Duchy to attend to other parts of his realm. 

In 1419, Margaret became a widow. Her son confirmed his father's appointment of Margaret as deputy regent of Burgundy, and she ruled Burgundy during the absence of her son in 1419-1423.

Children
 Margaret, Countess of Gien and Montargis (1393–2 February 1442, Paris), married, on 30 August 1404, Louis, Dauphin of France, then, on 10 October 1422, Arthur de Richemont, Constable of France, the future Duke of Brittany
 Catherine (d. 1414, Ghent)
 Mary (d. 30 October 1463, Monterberg bei Kalkar). She married Adolph I, Duke of Cleves.
 Philip the Good (1396–1467), Duke of Burgundy, Count of Flanders, etc.
 Isabella, Countess of Penthièvre (d. 18 September 1412, Rouvres), married at Arras on 22 July 1406 to Olivier de Châtillon-Blois, Count of Penthièvre and Périgord
 Joan (b. 1399, Bouvres), d. young
 Anne (1404 – 14 November 1432, Paris), married John, Duke of Bedford
 Agnes (1407 – 1 December 1476, Château de Moulins), married Charles I, Duke of Bourbon

Notes

References
 Bayley, Francis, The Bailleuls of Flanders and the Bayleys of Willow Hall, (Spottiswoode & Co.:London, 1881)

|-

Duchesses of Burgundy
1363 births
1424 deaths
House of Valois
House of Valois-Burgundy
House of Wittelsbach
Countesses of Artois
Countesses of Burgundy
Countesses of Flanders
Countesses of Nevers
Women of medieval Bavaria
Philip the Good (Duke of Burgundy)
15th-century women rulers
Women in medieval European warfare
Women in 15th-century warfare
Royal reburials
Daughters of monarchs